The 1914–15 season was the 21st in the history of the Southern League. Watford won Division One and Stoke finished top of the Division Two. Stoke were the only club to apply for election to the Football League and were successful. However, the United Kingdom declared war on Germany on 4 August 1914, thus entering World War I. The Football League and Southern League ceased operations until the war ended in November 1918. The next season would be 1919–20.

Division One

A total of 20 teams contest the division, including 18 sides from previous season and two new teams.
Teams promoted from 1913–14 Division Two:
 Croydon Common
 Luton Town

Division Two

A total of 13 teams contest the division, including 9 sides from previous season, two teams relegated from Division One and two new teams.

Teams relegated from 1913–14 Division One:
 Merthyr Town
 Coventry City
Newly elected teams:
 Stalybridge Celtic
 Ebbw Vale

Football League elections

1915
Stoke were the only Southern League club to apply for election to the Football League. They were successful, and replaced Glossop North End, who received only one vote. However, the League ceased operations for the war after its AGM and did not resume until 1919.

1919
Following World War I the Football League expanded from 40 to 44 clubs, creating four vacancies. Two Southern League clubs, Coventry City and West Ham United applied and were successful in the elections.

References

1914-15
1914–15 in English association football leagues
1914–15 in Welsh football